Fuscopannaria albomaculata is a species of squamulose (scaley), corticolous (bark-dwelling) lichen in the family Pannariaceae. Found in China, it was formally described as a new species in 2004 by Norwegian lichenologist Per Magnus Jørgensen. It is distinguished from other members of genus Fuscopannaria by the white spots on its thallus.

References

albomaculata
Lichen species
Lichens described in 2004
Lichens of China
Taxa named by Per Magnus Jørgensen